Events from the year 1580 in Sweden

Incumbents
 Monarch – John III

Events

 - Antonio Possevino inspect the Vadstena Abbey. During his visitation the abbey was reformed according to the latest regulations of the Catholic Church, and Katarina Bengtsdotter Gylta and her prioress swore the Tridentian oath from 1564.

Births

 Christina Natt och Dag, court official (died 1642)

Deaths

 Unknown date - Valborg Eriksdotter, royal mistress  (born 1545)

References

 
Years of the 16th century in Sweden
Sweden